The Fifth Ward is a community of Houston, Texas, United States, derived from a historical political district (ward), about  northeast of Downtown. Its boundaries are Buffalo Bayou on the south, Jensen Drive on the west, Liberty Road on the north, and Lockwood Drive on the east.

The Fifth Ward, one of the six wards of Houston, was created partly from two other wards, the First Ward, which ceded the area to the north and east of White Oak Bayou and Little White Oak Bayou, and the Second Ward, which ceded all land within the Houston city limits to the north of Buffalo Bayou.

History

Early history

In its initial history the Fifth Ward had many ethnic groups. Large numbers of the residents were Irish and Jews; the latter had fled pogroms in Russia and Eastern Europe, and lived mostly in the eastern parts, while the former lived mainly in the north. Richard West of the Texas Monthly characterized the early Fifth Ward as being "prosperous".

After the American Civil War, newly freed slaves began settling in the sparsely settled area. In 1866, it became the Fifth Ward  and an alderman from the ward was elected to Houston's City Council. By the mid-1880s, it was virtually all black, home to working-class people who made their livings in Houston's eastside ship channel and industrial areas or as domestics for wealthy Houstonians. Mount Vernon United Methodist Church, founded in 1865 by a former slave, is the oldest church in the ward. Five other churches are over a hundred years old. Also home to the famous "Island of Hope (Anderson Memorial Temple) COGIC" the oldest Pentecostal church in Fifth Ward. Over the years it had been home to the city's minority and immigrant population. Additional waves of Irish people, as well as Germans and Italians settled the Fifth Ward.

In the late 1800s the Fifth Ward community threatened to secede from the city of Houston twice, in 1875 and 1883. Complaints about inadequate municipal services, including fire and police services, lighting, sanitation, and drainage, occurred during this time period. The 1875 secession complaint asked for the paving of streets and upgrades to the utility system. The city government ameliorated the 1883 complaints by establishing a drawbridge at San Jacinto Street that crossed the Buffalo Bayou. It paved parts of Odin Avenue, now known as Lyons Avenue, in brick in the 1890s. The pavement ended two blocks after the residence of Mayor of Houston John T. Browne.

On February 21, 1912, with stiff Northern winds blowing in, the largest fire in Houston's history began. This fire became known as the "Great Fifth Ward Fire". The strong winds spread the fire as embers set wood-shingled roofs on fire.   It consumed a church, school, 13 industrial plants, eight stores, and 119 homes, mostly located in the Fifth Ward. There were no deaths, but there was over $3 million in property damage.

Post-World War I to the mid-20th century
In the post-World War I period the neighborhood makeup changed as a wave of African-Americans settled the Fifth Ward. The housing density increased as families put more people in each building in order to pay their rent. The buildings, occupied by too many people, began to deteriorate. Some Jewish people remained as landlords, but most of them moved away, with many of them going to New York City, including The Bronx; and Long Island.

Before desegregation the community housed African-Americans of all occupations and income levels. The community was known as the "bloody Fifth" because of some highly publicized violent incidents in the neighborhood; Michael Berryhill of the Houston Press stated that the Fifth Ward was not as blighted in the 1940s as it was during the 1990s. Robb Walsh of the Houston Press described the 1930s era Fifth Ward as "one of the proudest black neighborhoods" in the US; more than 40 black-owned businesses were along Lyons Avenue in the Fifth Ward at that time.

In the post-World War II period a large number of black migrants, many of them from Louisiana and some from East Texas and other areas in the Deep South, settled the Fifth Ward. The community became characterized by poverty since many of these migrants were unable to get non-menial jobs.

In 1949 Brown & Root began buying land in the Fifth Ward for its headquarters.

When Interstate 10 was built, it went through the Fifth Ward, dividing the community.

The city government established some pocket parks and added pavement, gutters, and curbing to several streets in the southernmost part of the Fifth Ward in the period 1964-1974, during the term of Mayor of Houston Louie Welch.

1970s and 1980s

Desegregation led middle class African-Americans to move to the suburbs. By the 1970s the Fifth Ward lost a significant part of its population, and many houses were boarded-up. Many area businesses were vacant and the area had many vacant lots with overgrown plants. In 1974 Whit described the neighborhood as "one of Houston's poorest ghettos". In the 1970s and 1980s the Fifth Ward became notorious throughout Houston for the violence perpetrated in the community. Ernest McMillan, a community activist and contributor to the Fifth Ward Enrichment Program, said in a 1987 Houston Chronicle article that "One of the differences between this neighborhood and one like River Oaks is that they have lots of support and all kinds of resources available. Here in the Fifth Ward it's the exact opposite: These people have no resources at all. There's one clinic, one library, no YMCA, very few activities, and the community is very fragmented. It's not the kind of environment that helps a child excel."

As of 1979 the median income in the Fifth Ward was $5,030 ($ adjusted for inflation), 25% of Fifth Ward residents had high school diplomas, and 34% of Fifth Ward residents lived below the poverty line. The respective citywide averages were a median income of $9,876 ($ adjusted for inflation), a percentage of those with high school diplomas of 52%, and a poverty line percentage of 10%. By 1979 only a few Italian American families remained in the Fifth Ward. By that year, black flight from the Fifth Ward to Kashmere Gardens, South Park, Sunnyside, and Trinity Gardens had occurred.

West wrote in 1979 that about 90% of the Fifth Ward was characterized by "physical ugliness" and "poverty" while there are some middle class "pockets of affluence" that do not have physical indications of troubled neighborhoods. At the time the Fifth Ward was more dense in terms of population than most Houston neighborhoods. The average Fifth Ward housing density was 9.14 and there were 30.5 persons per residential acre, while Houston's citywide average density and persons per residential acre were 4.98 and 14.4, respectively. In addition, 21% of city blocks had no drainage systems, while 39% had open ditches and 40% had storm sewers. West stated that the Fifth Ward's physical character was not like that of Harlem in New York City or Roxbury in Boston. In 1974 Whit Canning of Texas Monthly stated that the Fifth Ward was characterized by a "project-type apartment complex", "narrow streets" and "small stores". West wrote that the Fifth Ward had its environment "out in the open, on the street" and that it had "more barbershops, pawnshops, churches, loose dogs, abandoned buildings, bars, broken windows" while there were "fewer sidewalks, streetlights, fire hydrants, culverts, curbs, parks, jewelers, museums, libraries, garbage trucks."

In 1970 metal manufacturer Moncrief-Lenoir Manufacturing Company planned an urban renewal project, spending $10 million to buy  of land along  Lyons Avenue's western end, but nothing was built by 1979. It was scheduled to be one of the largest urban renewal projects in the United States.

1990s and onward
Between 1990 and 2000 the Hispanic population of the Fifth Ward increased from around 19% of the population to around 31% as Hispanics in the Houston area moved into majority black neighborhoods. In the same period, the black population of the Fifth Ward declined by 3,286 as majority African-American neighborhoods in Houston had declines in their black populations.

In 2000 the median annual income was $8,900. 62% of its residents lived below the poverty line. 9 of 10 school-aged children qualified for free or reduced lunches. The commercial streets had several empty buildings and vacant lots. Lisa Gray, a journalist in the Houston Press, stated in a 2000 article that the existing businesses "run mostly to dingy mom-and-pop operations, grim little grocery stores and cheerless liquor stores. There's no McDonald's, no Fiesta, no Target, no Wal-Mart. It's turf where national chains fear to tread." Gray added that the words "new" and "nice" were not often associated with the Fifth Ward, while "at-risk," "crime," and "poverty," were. Walsh said that the Fifth Ward in 2002 was "in much better shape" than it was in the 1970s; he added that while the Fifth Ward is "hardly a garden spot," the Fifth Ward Community Redevelopment Corporation took many steps to improve the community including assisting low income borrowers in finding loans, encouraging architects to develop "innovative designs" for low income housing, and bringing commercial building projects into the Fifth Ward.

Japhet, a section of the Fifth Ward at Emile Street at Clinton Drive (two blocks east of Hirsch Road/Waco Street), was the Houston Press 2004 "Best Hidden Neighborhood." The article stated "Say the words "Fifth Ward" to most Houstonians, and they'll think crime, poverty and desperation." The article added that Japhet is "more like a village than anything else -- fragrant organic gardens are everywhere, bursting with vegetables, fruits and flowers, and the whole neighborhood comes together for a big party every full moon."

In 2007 the Fifth Ward was one of several Houston neighborhoods with a high concentration of felons. During that year a debate regarding the ownership of the historic Evergreen Negro Cemetery in the Fifth Ward continued. Some Hurricane Katrina evacuees also moved from Southwest Houston and lived in other parts of Houston such as the Fifth Ward.

In 2020 a survey concluded that 43% of area families had at least one member diagnosed with cancer.

Demographics
In 2015 the Greater Fifth Ward Super Neighborhood had 19,687 residents. 48% were non-Hispanic Black, 46% were Hispanic, 4% were non-Hispanic white, and 1% each was non-Hispanic Asian and non-Hispanic other. In 2000 the super neighborhood had 22,211 residents. 63% were non-Hispanic black, 35% were Hispanic, and 1% were non-Hispanic white; the percentages of non-Hispanic Asians and others were zero.

In 1870 16% of the African Americans in Houston lived in the Fifth Ward, and in 1910 21% of the African Americans in Houston lived in the Fifth Ward.

Government and infrastructure

Fifth Ward is currently located in City Council District B. As of 2015 Jerry Davis represents the district.

The community is served by the Houston Police Department Northeast Patrol Division, headquartered at 8301 Ley Road. The Fifth Ward Storefront is located in Suite 200 at 4300 Lyons Avenue.

The Houston Fire Department operates Station 19 Fifth Ward, a part of Fire District 19, on 1811 Gregg Street. The station first opened in 1925 at the corner of Gregg and New Orleans. The current location opened in 1979 at the opposite side of the intersection. In 1979 it had the highest number of fire and ambulance, beating, cutting, dead on arrival, emergency birth and other obstetric, false alarm, sickness and shooting calls of any Houston fire station.

The Harris Health System (formerly Harris County Hospital District) designated the Ripley Health Center for the ZIP code 77020. The designated public hospital is Ben Taub General Hospital in the Texas Medical Center.

The Houston Housing Authority (HHA) operates several public housing properties in the Fifth Ward. The include Kelly Village and Kennedy Place. Kennedy Place first opened as a 60 unit development in 1982. The HHA used $7.8 million, including some federal stimulus funds, to redevelop the housing. The demolition of the old Kennedy Place began on December 28, 2009. In January 2011 the new Kennedy Place opened, with 108 units (20 one bedroom, 58 two bedroom, 23 three bedroom, and 4 four bedroom). It also once had Kelly Court, which was the second-ever Houston housing project that admitted African-Americans.

In 2002, open ditches were the predominant form of drainage of water in the Fifth Ward.

The Fifth Ward is in Texas's 18th congressional district. Its representative as of 2021 is Sheila Jackson Lee.

Multi-service center and senior center
The city operates the Fifth Ward Multi-Service Center at 4014 Market Street, The city multi-service centers provide several services such as child care, programs for elderly residents, and rental space. in proximity to Interstate 10. The center, operated by the Houston Department of Health and Human Services, houses ten agencies, including the Fifth Ward Branch Library, American Red Cross, Harris County Juvenile Probation Program, Mayor's Citizens' Assistance Office, Neighborhood Centers Inc., and Fifth Ward Head Start. The center opened in 1977 so that various social services supporting the Fifth Ward would be located in one place. It was built for $1 million (equivalent to $ in ), and by 1979 it had a day care, a juvenile probation center, a housing counseling center, an employment center, a health clinic, a library, a senior citizen service center, and other services, provided by nine agencies. In 2005 the multi-service center served 65,000 people.

In a 2001 bond election voters approved an expansion and renovation of the multi-service center. On October 12, 2006 the city of Houston began the first phase of a renovation and expansion project for the center. The city scheduled completion for September 2007. The city scheduled the start of the second phase, a $2 million renovation project of the original  structure, after the end of the first phase.

The Department of Health and Human Services also operates the John Wesley Peavy Sr. Senior Citizens Center, adjacent to the Multi-Service Center. It was named after John Wesley Peavy Sr., an East Texas native who served as a precinct judge in the area.

Economy
West stated that possible reasons why the business climate in the Fifth Ward was poor, according to different people in the Fifth Ward, include a lack of effort to get investment from White people, the construction of freeways that cut off parts of the Fifth Ward, a lack of investment in the appearance of businesses, white persons leaving the Fifth Ward and taking capital, and the closing of the Lyons Avenue exit off of the Eastex Freeway, the eastern portion of U.S. Route 59 in Houston. West also stated that black flight contributed to the decline in Fifth Ward businesses.

As of 1979 most businesses in the Fifth Ward were personal service affairs common to other low income neighborhoods in the United States, such as pawnshops, funeral parlors, bars, barbershops, cleaners, cafes, and liquor stores. As of 1979 Mack Hanna, a black man from Houston, owned the Standard Savings Association, the only financial institution in the Fifth Ward.

In 2011 Jarvis Johnson, a member of the Houston City Council, said "The Fifth Ward is void of jobs. There aren't any commercial grocery stores. There aren't any places where young people can get a job."

Corporate presence

KBR maintained offices in a  campus on Clinton Drive, within the boundaries of the East End and the Fifth Ward. This property was along the Buffalo Bayou. As of December 2010 KBR no longer operates this office.

The KBR office complex was the former headquarters of Brown & Root. Brown and Root began buying land in the Fifth Ward in 1949. It initially acquired , then it acquired an additional .

By 2001 Halliburton owned the Clinton Drive campus. In August of that year Halliburton announced that it would consolidate 8,000 local employees to office space in Westchase. Halliburton planned to relocate around 2,000 employees from Clinton Drive and the industrial facilities would have been relocated to a location that was, in that month, undetermined. Sanford Criner, a principal at real estate brokerage Trione & Gordon, suggested that gentrification would turn what would have been the former Clinton Drive facility into entertainment, residential, or retail use, and that the facility would not have been redeveloped for office space usage. In December 2001 Halliburton canceled its plans to relocate employees to Westchase. Nancy Sarnoff of the Houston Business Journal said that it made more sense for the company to lease existing space instead of constructing new office space in times of economic downturns.

In 2010 KBR announced that it will vacate the Clinton Drive campus and move the 1,600 employees who work at the Clinton Drive office to the KBR offices in Downtown Houston. The company will then conduct an environmental cleanup of the Clinton Drive site.

Geography
Two majority-Hispanic (as of 2001) communities, Denver Harbor and Northside, are on either end of the Fifth Ward.

"Big Tree," a tree in an area where Interstate 10 and U.S. Route 59 (Eastex Freeway) now intersect, historically has been the center of activity in the Fifth Ward and was in proximity to the terminus of the streetcar line.

Lyons Avenue serves as a primary road in the Fifth Ward. In 1979 West wrote that Lyons Avenue, named after saloon owner John Lyons, served as the "Soul Street" of Houston, declaring it equivalent to 125th Street in Harlem, 47th Street in Chicago, South Street in Philadelphia, Seventh and T in Washington, D.C., Tremont Street in Boston, and Springfield Avenue in Newark, New Jersey. In the 1920s the Lyons family owned many businesses along the street, originally named Odin Avenue after the first bishop of the Roman Catholic Archdiocese of Galveston-Houston, John Mary Odin. The street received its current name in 1927. In pre-desegregation Fifth Ward, Lyons and Jensen were primary commercial avenues.

As of 1979 the intersection of Lyons Avenue and Jensen Drive was called "Pearl Harbor" due to many violent incidents occurring there.

The southern edge of the Fifth Ward, along the Buffalo Bayou, housed farms in its early history before becoming a host of slums and the city dump by the 1920s. Cleanup of this area began when Brown and Root began establishing its headquarters in the late 1940s.

The railyard, owned by Southern Pacific, includes a wood preservation plant. This plant, as of 1979, gives a distinct odor that caused area Mexican Americans to name it el Creosote. In 1979 Englewood Radar Yard was the largest railyard in the Southern United States.

In 2019 the Texas Department of State Health Services conducted of a study of an area in the Fifth Ward around Lavender Street, near a creosote facility of a former rail yard, where cancer rates were higher than normal.

Frenchtown

In 1922, a group of Louisiana Creoles organized the Fifth Ward community of "Frenchtown," which contained a largely Roman Catholic and Creole culture. The Great Mississippi Flood of 1927 forced many Creoles to leave Louisiana, and they settled the Frenchtown area. When new residents no longer moved to Frenchtown, the neighborhood culturally merged with the greater Fifth Ward.

Culture

Lisa Gray, a journalist for the Houston Press, stated in a 2000 article that the Fifth Ward has an overall sense of history and a "small-scale, deep-rooted personal history, the way that, in the middle of the city, lives are intertwined in a small-town way." Many families from the area had lived in the Fifth Ward for several generations.

In previous eras, African-Americans of all social classes lived in the Fifth Ward; African-American professionals patronized businesses. After the end of segregation, African-American professionals began to patronize other neighborhoods, and members of the African-American middle class moved out of the Fifth Ward.

The north-south Southern Pacific Transportation Company railroad tracks separate the Fifth Ward from Denver Harbor. David Benson, an assistant to Harris County Commissioner El Franco Lee, described the railroad line as "a semi-permeable membrane." In the 1990s many Fifth Ward African-Americans went into Denver Harbor to shop at the area supermarket and stores, while the Denver Harbor Hispanics rarely entered the Fifth Ward.

Richard West of the Texas Monthly wrote in 1979 that within the Fifth Ward one's personal status "is determined less by what you have than by personal qualities of wit and style and by what you know of the power structure of the street".

Religion
Mount Vernon United Methodist Church, founded in 1865, is the community's oldest church, and the Fifth Ward has six churches that, as of 2011, are over 100 years old. Kate Shellnutt of the Houston Chronicle said that the historic church facilities "have been community strongholds."

In 1979 the largest church in the Fifth Ward was the Pleasant Grove Baptist Church, with 5,600 members.

The Our Mother of Mercy Catholic Church, completed in 1930 by Creoles for Creoles, serves as a social center for the Frenchtown neighborhood.

Education

Primary and secondary schools

Public schools
Area students attend schools in the Houston Independent School District.  even though most of the Fifth Ward and the adjacent Denver Harbor neighborhood are zoned to the same high school, the areas are represented by different board members.

Elementary schools in the Fifth Ward and serving sections of the Fifth Ward include Charles H. Atherton, Blanche Kelso Bruce, Dogan, and Nathaniel Q. "Nat" Henderson. Sherman Elementary School, outside of the Fifth Ward, serves a portion.  due to the proximity of Interstate 45, Bruce Elementary experienced noise pollution and twice the amount of asthma compared to the HISD average. About 99% of the students were black or Hispanic.

Some areas are zoned to John L. McReynolds Middle School in Denver Harbor, and some areas are zoned to Lamar Fleming Middle School, north of the Fifth Ward. Phillis Wheatley High School in the Fifth Ward serves almost all of the Fifth Ward, while Northside High School (formerly Jefferson Davis High School) serves a small portion of the Fifth Ward. Young Men's College Preparatory Academy, an all-boys middle and high school, is in the Fifth Ward.

YES Prep Fifth Ward, a state charter school, is in the Fifth Ward. It was founded in 2011. Northwest Preparatory Academy, a state charter school, is in the Fifth Ward.

Private schools
A Kindergarten through 8 Roman Catholic school called Our Mother of Mercy School, the school of the Our Mother of Mercy Catholic Church of the Roman Catholic Archdiocese of Galveston-Houston, was in the area. It closed in Spring 2009. The school was consolidated with St. Francis of Assisi School in Kashmere Gardens, which closed in 2020.

Histories of schools
Smith Education Center first opened in 1913. Crawford opened in 1917. Bruce opened at 713 Bringurst in 1920. Davis opened in 1926. On January 31, 1927 Wheatley first opened in the former McGowan Elementary School building. A school which was originally a county school was relocated to 2011 Solo Street in 1927; in 1929 it was renamed after Charles H. Atherton. The building later known as Carter Career Center opened in 1929. Wheatley received a new facility in 1949. A school was named after Nathaniel Q. Henderson in 1956. McReynolds opened in 1957. Fleming opened in 1968. In 2006 much of Wheatley High School had been rebuilt. Bruce moved to a new facility at 510 Jensen Drive in 2007.

By Spring 2011 Atherton Elementary School and E.O. Smith Education Center (K-8) were consolidated with a new K-5 campus in the Atherton site. By Spring 2011 Crawford Elementary School, a campus in the Fifth Ward, and Sherman Elementary School, a campus outside of the Fifth Ward, were consolidated, with a new campus in the Sherman site. As of Spring 2011 Atherton is located in the previous Concord Elementary School/North District office building. Fifth Ward middle school students previously zoned to Smith were rezoned to Fleming and McReynolds.

By 2011, Young Men's College Preparatory Academy was to open in the current Smith location. By 2015 it moved to the former Crawford Elementary School. Its permanent campus is on the site of the former Carter Career Center.

The Fifth Ward included the DeVry Advantage Academy, a DeVry University-affiliated HISD high school housed in a building that was formerly housing Carter Career Center, an HISD vocational school and pregnant girls' school. DeVry opened in 2011 and closed in 2012.

Benji's Special Educational Academy, a state charter school near the Fifth Ward, merged into Victory Preparatory Academy in 2011; that northern campus of V Prep closed in February 2018.

Public libraries
The Fifth Ward is served by the Houston Public Library Fifth Ward Neighborhood Library.

Community services

Fifth Ward Community Redevelopment Corporation is a nonprofit community-based agency located in Houston’s historic Fifth Ward community. Kathy Payton is the President and CEO of Fifth Ward CRC which was founded in direct response to a period of negative migration – when businesses were fleeing the community, public schools were closing, school dropout rates and teen pregnancies were increasing and the community as a whole was being decimated by the prevalence of multiple social and economic ills.  In 1989, the community responded to the devastation in the Fifth Ward when civic leaders,  business owners, ministers and educators came together to establish a point of positive systemic change and Fifth Ward CRC was formed.  Since its inception, the organization has operated under the same name, without change. The Fifth Ward Community Redevelopment Corporation (FWCRC) is to serve as a catalytic organization dedicated to the collaborative fostering of holistic community development. Since its inception in 1989, Fifth Ward CRC has built 300+ new homes, two multifamily complexes totaling 336 units, two commercial developments, four public art installations and two community gateway monuments.  It has preserved and renovated two of the most significant landmarks in the area—the historic St. Elizabeth Clinic and the historic Lonnie Smith house.  To support homeownership and enhance affordability, the organization has provided more than $500,000 in second mortgages to those in need – loans averaging between $5,000 and $30,000 that benefited more than 70 individuals and families. Fifth Ward CRC's corporate offices are located at 4300 Lyons Avenue, Houston, Texas 77020.

The Fifth Ward Enrichment Program (FWEP), a social service for sons of single mothers, was developed by Ernest McMillan in the mid-1980s. It operates afterschool programs.

Community Partners operated community services in the Fifth Ward.

The Human Organizational Political and Economic Development, Inc. (HOPE), the second-ever antipoverty agency in Houston, was based out of three buildings on Lyons Avenue as of 1979. It operated a Black Arts Center and the Roxy Theater, and published the Voice of Hope. Methodist minister Reverend Earl Allen worked to establish the agency, funded with $27,000 ($ adjusted for inflation), was established in the summer of 1967. John de Menil was instrumental in providing funding, and HOPE encountered financial difficulty's after de Menil's 1973 death. The Emergency School Aid act provided $164,000 ($ adjusted for inflation) in September 1978, and the National Endowment of the Arts stated that it was going to give a grant of $15,000 ($ adjusted for inflation) one month later.

FORGOTTEN DOGS OF THE FIFTH WARD is a group of dedicated volunteers who help the forgotten and abandoned animals of the 5th Ward, offering animals in need help with placement in a no kill rescue, and assist the residents of this area with food, vetting and pet care as needed.  http://www.forgottendogs.org/

Habitat for Humanity built Fifth Ward houses beginning in 1991, with the first on Rowley Street.

Parks and recreation

Finnigan Park and Community Center, operated by Harris County Precinct One, is located at 4900 Providence. The park has a lighted sports field, a swimming pool, lighted tennis courts, a .65 mile hike and bicycle trail, and a playground. The community center has an indoor gymnasium, a weight room a kitchen and a computer room. It was named after the person who donated the land for the park in 1939, Annette Finnigan. In May 2011 the city announced that it is closing Finnigan Pool.

The Swiney Community Center, operated by the City of Houston is located at 2812 Cline. The center has a playground and an outdoor basketball pavilion.

The city will establish the Fifth Ward Future Park at 4700 Clinton, 77020.

The Julia C. Hester House serves as a settlement house and community center. As of 1979 it offers youth activities and community services, and it is a part of the United Fund. It was originally known as Houston Negro Community Center of the Fifth Ward, but it received its current name before its opening. A biracial committee established the center in 1943 to improve the education, health, and welfare of Fifth Ward residents. It originally used rented facilities on Lyons Avenue, before moving into a $150,000 building on Solo Street in 1949; the center has occupied the Solo Street building since then. West wrote that in the Fifth Ward the Hester House "is as much an institution as Wheatley High."

The Northeast Family YMCA serves residents of the Fifth Ward.

Transportation

Metropolitan Transit Authority of Harris County, Texas (METRO) operates bus routes. The agency operates the Fifth Ward/Denver Harbor Transit Center on Lockwood Street.

Prior to 1952 electric streetcar services were available on Lyons Avenue. Buses with steel wheels used these tracks during the late 1950s.

In media
Greg Carter created the 1997 film Fifth Ward, financed from borrowed money from his mother and an insurance claim, and later made a derivative television show also called Fifth Ward.

Notable people

5th Ward Boyz
John T. Browne, (Mayor of Houston) - As of 1979 his residence was used as an Italian American-owned grocery store, Orlando's Grocery
Arnett Cobb, saxophonist
Carl Crawford, professional baseball player
Alfred C. Finn, architect  
George Foreman - professional boxer and heavyweight champion
Geto Boys
Willie D
Bushwick Bill
Scarface_(rapper) 
Illinois Jacquet, jazz musician
Barbara Jordan, US congressperson and civil rights leader
As of 1979 Jordan's parents continued to live in the Fifth Ward.
Milton Larkin, saxophonist
Mickey Leland, US Congressperson and community leader
As of 1979 Leland's parents continued to live in the Fifth Ward.
Ruth McClendon, state legislator representing a district in San Antonio
James Prince 
Joe Sample
Ruth Simmons, president of Prairie View A&M University and former President of Brown University
Lonnie Smith, plaintiff of Smith v. Allwright
Selvin Young
Fruits of the Fifth Ward, a mural depicting 21 notable individuals who are natives of the Fifth Ward or have connections to the Fifth Ward, was created by Wheatley High School students. Reginald Adams, the executive director of the Museum of Cultural Arts Houston (MOCAH), oversaw the creation of the mural. The project began after the History Channel gave MOCAH a $10,000 grant to create a mural depicting the history of the Fifth Ward. The mural was constructed from February 15 to October 21, 2006. The mural was dedicated on Saturday October 21, 2006. The mural is adjacent to Crawford Elementary School.

See also
 History of the African-Americans in Houston

References

Notes

External links

 
 

Neighborhoods in Houston